Prince Abdullah bin Jalawi Stadium is a football stadium in Al-Hasa, Saudi Arabia.  It is used mainly for football and hosts the home matches of Al Fateh and Hajer Club of the Saudi Professional League.  The stadium has a seating capacity of 19,550 spectators.

External links
Stadium information

Football venues in Saudi Arabia